The Bridge over Fountain Creek which was built to bring U.S. Route 24 (US 24) over Fountain Creek, approximately  north of Manitou Springs, Colorado, was built in 1932. It now carries US 24 Business (US 24 Bus.; Manitou Avenue). It is an open spandrel deck arch span. It was listed on the National Register of Historic Places in 1985.

It was designed by engineer King Burghardt, who was "one of the Highway Department's most innovative bridge engineers". It is a  reinforced concrete bridge. It "featured attractive rubble masonry retaining walls and lamposts at the approaches", but the lamposts have since been removed. Burghardt also designed the Red Cliff Bridge which carries US 24 in Red Cliff, Colorado, and Sevenmile Bridge, near Creede, Colorado, both of which are also listed on the National Register.

It was constructed by contractor Pueblo Bridge & Construction Co. at cost of $44,695 (equivalent to $ million in  dollars).

See also
Bridge over Fountain Creek (Manitou Avenue), in Manitou Springs and also NRHP-listed, as a contributing structure in Manitou Springs Historic District

References

Road bridges in Colorado
National Register of Historic Places in El Paso County, Colorado
Bridges completed in 1932
U.S. Route 24
Bridges of the United States Numbered Highway System

1932 establishments in Colorado